TeleForm is a forms processing application originally developed by Cardiff Software and now owned by OpenText.

Function 
TeleForm performs several tasks:
 design machine-readable data forms in a drag-and-drop WYSIWYG design environment
 scan images using high-volume document scanners
 ingest images created by other applications
 automatically read data from completed forms
 allows users to review and correct data, if needed
 export and store the read data in an external database

Forms can be individually designed within the application or templated using existing forms. When completed forms are scanned, any handwritten, machine-printed, barcodes, and bubble responses are read, evaluated, verified, and exported to the end databases.

Dependencies 
Functionality of TeleForm, and similar applications, relies heavily on other technologies.

TeleForm uses several sorts of optical technologies to process forms:
 Optical Mark Recognition (OMR)
 Optical Character Recognition (OCR)
 Intelligent Character Recognition (ICR)
 Bar Code Recognition

History 
Originally designed in 1991 to capture data from faxed forms, TeleForm handles data from fax, paper and electronic forms.

The Cardiff TeleForm product was re-branded Verity TeleForm for a brief period in 2004 and 2005, when Verity Inc acquired Cardiff Software.  In 2005, Autonomy acquired Verity, and the Cardiff brand was reintroduced as "Autonomy TeleForm".  On August 18, 2011, HP announces its intention to purchase Autonomy. TeleForm was officially re-branded as HP TeleForm in the release notes for version 10.9  TeleForm was purchased by OpenText in 2016 and is sold and supported as OpenText TeleForm.

References

External links
 OpenText Acquires TeleForm 2016
  Electric Paper Informationssysteme GmbH
 ePC, TeleForm and LiquidOffice specialists and OpenText OEM partner
  Tecnomedia Sistemas SL
 SR Capture: Teleform and data capture specialists. Creators of SRCloud.
 Formtran, Inc.: TeleForm and LiquidOffice specialists
 Genoko: TeleForm and LiquidOffice specialists
 Digiform: TeleForm and LiquidOffice specialists
 Teleform support: TeleForm and LiquidOffice support

Business software
Optical character recognition